Mogri may refer to:
Moogle, from Final Fantasy
Meghri, Armenia